The Yacht Club Boys were a quartet of American comic singers, popular in the 1920s and 1930s. The best-known set of Yacht Club Boys consisted of Charlie Adler, George Kelly, Billy Mann, and Jimmie Kern. They made recordings from the 1920s and appeared as a specialty act in several feature films and short subjects of the 1930s. The Yacht Club Boys' screen career and on-screen behavior paralleled those of The Ritz Brothers, a musical-comedy trio doing the same type of musical burlesques.

The Yacht Club Boys began in 1926 as a "smart set" nightclub act: Chick Endor (lead vocalist and guitarist), George Walsh (piano), Tommy Purcell (violin), and Billy Mann (comedian). They earned high billing and high salaries almost immediately, and embarked on a European tour within their first year. In 1929 Jimmie Kern replaced Purcell, who had retired from show business, and the act became "collegiate." The group now dressed in varsity-styled sweaters and slacks, and sang novelty tunes in breezy fashion ("I'm Wild About Horns on an Automobile", "Nasty Nancy, the Meanest Gal in Town"). This foursome appeared in musical short subjects for Paramount Pictures in 1929–30. Endor and Walsh each had marital problems resulting in financial troubles and heavy alimony penalties, and withdrew from the act. By this time Billy Mann had become the leader behind the scenes, handling all the business details for the group.

In 1931 Charlie Adler and George Kelly joined Mann and Kern, and this became the permanent personnel. The Yacht Club Boys became strictly comic singers, abandoning their musical instruments, and refined their act to include sharper, broader humor, satirizing current events and trends. For example, "The Super-Special Picture of the Year" took aim at Hollywood hyperbole in general ("It's colossal, tremendous, gigantic, stupendous!") and famous movie director Ernst Lubitsch in particular, as voiced by Charlie Adler. They composed much of their own material, credited in alphabetical order to "Adler, Kelly, Kern, and Mann" (although Kern was the chief writer). They starred in short subjects for Paramount in 1933–34, then for Vitaphone in 1935–36, with titles emphasizing their wacky approach: Dough-Nuts, The Vodka Boatmen, etc. They also maintained a busy schedule of network radio appearances and recording sessions.

The Yacht Club Boys brought great energy to their performances, with brash songs like "You're Broke, You Dope" and "My, How the Country's Changed." Perhaps their most familiar screen appearances are in Al Jolson's The Singing Kid (1936), in which the four outspoken comics persistently try to keep Jolson from singing outdated "mammy songs;" and the collegiate musical Pigskin Parade (1936), in which they perform their specialties at college rallies.

Other activities
The group pursued other interests in 1939 and disbanded that year. Jimmie Kern was the first to leave, settling in Hollywood to become a screenwriter and later a director. To fulfill the quartet's remaining commitments, Kern was replaced by singer Jimmie Craig. Later in 1939 Billy Mann, a successful investor, bought the Irving Aaronson orchestra outright, retaining Aaronson as pianist. Meanwhile, Charlie Adler and George Kelly became restaurateurs, buying the Tavern restaurant on 48th Street in New York City.

The Yacht Club Boys quartet made a brief comeback in nightclubs in 1942. Charlie Adler and George Kelly returned, adding new members Rodney McLennon and Bill Dwyer.

Later years

Charlie Adler and George Kelly remained partners in a succession of nightclub and restaurant ventures; Adler died in 1955. Kelly opened "Kelly's Deli" in New York City in 1960. Jimmie Kern became known professionally as Hollywood director James V. Kern, directing many motion pictures and  the I Love Lucy TV series; he died in 1966. Billy Mann, who had been an individual investor, became a professional stockbroker; he died in 1974.

Partial filmography

 The Singing Fool (1928)
 On the High C's (short, 1929)
 Deep "C" Melodies (short, 1930)
 A Private Engagement (short, 1930)
 Hear Ye! Hear Ye! (short, 1934)
 Broadway Knights (short, 1934)
 The Singing Kid (1936)
 Thanks a Million (1935)
 The Vodka Boatmen (short, 1935)
 They're Off (short, 1936)

 Stage Struck (1936)
 Dough-Nuts (short, 1936)
 Pigskin Parade (1936)
 Artists and Models (1937)
 Thrill of a Lifetime (1937, billed as the stars)
 Cocoanut Grove (1938)
 Artists and Models Abroad (1938)

References

External links

American pop music groups
Musical quartets
Musical groups disestablished in 1939